This List of Australian art awards covers the main art awards given by organisations based in Australia. Most are for Australian art but some are open to artists from elsewhere.

See also
Lists of art awards

References

External links